Kinmel Bay and Towyn ( is a community in Conwy County Borough, in Wales. The community includes the holiday resorts of Kinmel Bay and Towyn. It is crossed by the Afon Gele, which flows from west to east, before joining the River Clwyd on the eastern boundary. At the 2001 census the community had a population of 7,864, increasing to 8,460 at the 2011 census. Before being named Kinmel Bay there was a small settlement called Foryd, which is the name of the bridge crossing into Rhyl.
The area is very Anglicized, with well over half the population having been born in England.

The area was developed after 1793, when the Rhuddlan Marsh Commissioners were granted powers to drain the area around Towyn. In the mid 19th century, flood defences were constructed to protect the new Chester to Holyhead railway.  Storm-force winds, a high tide and storm surge caused the defences to fail over a  stretch in 1990, resulting in the flooding of 2,800 properties.  The flood water covered . Since then a rock revetment has been constructed to protect the breached coastline, and further protective works have been carried out to the east.

St Mary's Church, in Towyn, was built in 1873 and designed by George Edmund Street, who was also the architect for the Royal Courts of Justice in London. It is in the Early Decorated style, and is Grade II* listed, as is the nearby Towyn and Kinmel Bay Youth Club, built two years earlier and also designed by Street. Also listed is the third building of Street's contract, the former vicarage, now Ty'n Llan Nursing Home.
Horror writer James Henry Kinmel Sangster was born in Kimmel Bay.

References

External links 

 Towyn and Kinmel Bay Town Council
 A Vision of Britain Through Time
 British Listed Buildings
 Clwyd Churches
 Genuki
 Geograph
 Office for National Statistics